Auto Express 86 is a class of high-speed catamaran vehicle-passenger ferries built by Austal of Australia.

Ships
Adnan Menderes (1998) - for Istanbul Deniz Otobusleri
ex Turgut Ozal / Thunder (1998) - for Fast Ferries
Jonathan Swift (1999) - for Irish Ferries
Carmen Ernestina (1999) - for Conferry
Villum Clausen / WorldChampion Jet (2000) - for Seajets
Lilia Concepcion (2002) - for Conferry
Spirit of Ontario I (2004) - for Canadian American Transportation Systems

Data
Passengers: 800-1040 (400-)
Vehicles: 215 cars or 10 buses and 125 cars
Speed: 40-50 knots

References

External links
Auto Express 86 Austal
Datasheet Austal

Ferry classes
Ferries of Australia
High-speed craft
Catamarans